{{DISPLAYTITLE:C6H14O3}}
The molecular formula C6H14O3 (molar mass: 134.17 g/mol, exact mass: 134.0943 u) may refer to:

 Diglyme
 Dipropylene glycol
 2-(2-Ethoxyethoxy)ethanol
 Trimethylolpropane

Molecular formulas